Nogueira is a civil parish in the municipality of Bragança, Portugal. The population in 2011 was 495, in an area of 12.07 km².

References

Parishes of Bragança, Portugal